The Angora Lakes are two small freshwater lakes in the Sierra Nevada and Lake Tahoe Watershed ~ in elevation above Fallen Leaf Lake and Lake Tahoe. It is the location of the Angora Lakes Resort, a small summer outdoor recreation location.  The lakes were named for a herd of Angora goats that used to graze in the area.

(Alternate route: Lake Tahoe Blvd. to Tahoe Mountain Rd.) Turn left and climb to the top of the one-lane road and look for the dirt road and a sign reading "1214". From there, an at times steep and at times paved road leads to fantastic vistas and ends in the Angora Lakes trailhead parking lot. There is a  uphill hike to Angora Lake.

Tourist activities 
The road to the lower parking lot is open from approximately May 1 to October 1, during which time the resort may be accessed on foot. At the resort at the upper lake, a small snack bar serves sandwiches, "world famous" lemonade, and ice cream.  Rowboats, kayaks, and paddle boards can be rented.

A cliff face at the upper lake can serve as a jumping platform. The highest ledge that is typically used is approximately sixty feet above the water.  During the summer tourist season, jumps are frequent.

A narrow beach consisting of granite sand, located on the northwestern shore, is a popular spot for swimming and sunbathing.

Parking (fee-based) in the lot at the end of Angora Ridge Road is limited. On summer weekends, the lot often fills by mid-morning. Parking along Angora Ridge Road is restricted.

Water sports
During the summer, the lake is popular for water sports, cliff jumping, and beach activities. The two cities most identified with the Lake Tahoe tourist area are South Lake Tahoe, California and the smaller Stateline, Nevada; smaller centers on the northern shoreline include Tahoe City and Kings Beach.

Angora Fire of 2007

The so-called "Angora Fire" started around 1:00 pm on Sunday, June 24, 2007, at the southern end of remote heavily forested land below Angora Ridge Road and extended from Meyers and Fallen Leaf Lake on the south and west to Camp Richardson near Lake Tahoe's southern shore.  Strong winds caused the fire to quickly spread uncontrolled through steep terrain.  Most of the devastation to homes was near N. Upper Truckee Rd. where the fire destroyed 254 homes, damaged 26 homes, numerous other structures valued at $141 million and prompted 3,000 evacuations, making it among the half dozen or so most destructive fires in U.S. history.  No commercial structures were involved. For $15 million, 2,100 firefighters, 145 engines, and 9 air tankers battled the blaze, which consumed 3,100 acres (12.5 square kilometers) and filled the entire Tahoe basin with dense smoke for several days.  High winds initially spread the fire and caused most of the property losses, but much calmer conditions on the ensuing three days allowed firefighters to contain it 70% with firebreak lines around it.

No thunderstorms were in the area at the time, and it is assumed that the fire was human-caused.

The ash from the fire that falls in Lake Tahoe is considered to be a problem for the clarity of Lake Tahoe, and Governor Schwarzenegger of California pledged to spend the necessary funds to restore the land values adequately to prevent erosion from depositing the ash on the ground into the lake and further damaging it.

Nearby peaks and mountains
Echo Peak 8,895 ft (2,711.2 m)
Angora Peak 8,588 ft (2,617.6 m)
Mount Tallac 9,735 ft (2,967 m)
Ralston Peak 9,235 ft (2,814.8 m)
Pyramid Peak 9,985 ft (3,043.4 m)

See also
Emerald Bay State Park
List of lakes in California

References

External links
Angora Lakes plant list
Angora Fire Restoration Project (US Forest Service)

Lakes of the Sierra Nevada (United States)
Lakes of El Dorado County, California
Lake Tahoe
Tahoe National Forest
Ski areas and resorts in California
Lakes of Northern California
Lakes of California